RU-28306 is a tricyclic tryptamine derivative which acts as a serotonin receptor agonist, with selectivity for 5-HT1 and 5-HT2 subtypes. It can be regarded either as a conformationally constrained derivative of DMT, or a structurally simplified analogue of LSD, but the binding affinity of racemic RU-28306 is closer to that of DMT, though with relatively higher affinity for 5-HT2 subtypes and lower for 5-HT1. It has been sold as a designer drug and was first reported to the EMCDDA by a forensic laboratory in Slovenia in 2017.

See also
 4,5-DHP-DMT
 Bay R 1531
 NDTDI
 RU-24,969

References 

Serotonin receptor agonists
Tryptamines
Phenethylamines